The 1955 World Table Tennis Championships men's doubles was the 22nd edition of the men's doubles championship.
Ivan Andreadis and Ladislav Štípek won the title after defeating Žarko Dolinar and Vilim Harangozo in the final by three sets to nil.

Results

See also
List of World Table Tennis Championships medalists

References

-